R580 road may refer to:
 R580 road (Ireland)
 R580 (South Africa)